In consumer law, false designation of origin occurs when the manufacturer or seller lies about the country of origin or maker of its products.  For example, if a manufacturer makes a product and then claims that it is a high end name brand product.

References 

Supply chain management
False advertising law